Jen Easterly is an American intelligence and former military official who is serving as the director of the Cybersecurity and Infrastructure Security Agency in the Biden administration. She was confirmed by a voice vote in the Senate on July 12, 2021.

Early life and education 
Raised in Potomac, Maryland, Easterly attended Winston Churchill High School and graduated as valedictorian in 1986. She earned a bachelor's degree from the United States Military Academy in 1990 and a Master of Arts in politics, philosophy, and economics from Pembroke College, Oxford, where she studied as a Rhodes Scholar.

Career 
Easterly served in the United States Army for twenty years and was an assistant professor of social sciences at the United States Military Academy. She was approved for promotion to major in 2000, lieutenant colonel in 2006 and colonel in 2012.

From 2002 to 2004, she was executive assistant to the National Security advisor. From 2004 to 2006, she was a battalion executive officer and brigade operations officer in the 704th Military Intelligence Brigade, a subordinate unit of the United States Army Intelligence and Security Command. Easterly was deployed to Baghdad as chief of the cryptologic services group for the National Security Agency. She also worked for NSA's elite Tailored Access Operations.

From 2009 to 2010, Easterly served on the United States Cyber Command, which she helped establish. From 2010 to 2011, Easterly was a cyber advisor for the NSA stationed in Kabul. After retiring from the Army as a lieutenant colonel, she served as deputy director of the NSA for counterterrorism from May 2011 to October 2013. From October 2013 to February 2016, Easterly was a special assistant to President Barack Obama and senior director for counterterrorism on the National Security Council. After the end of the Obama administration, Easterly joined Morgan Stanley as global head of the company's cybersecurity division.

Director of the Cybersecurity and Infrastructure Security Agency 
An uncontroversial nominee, Easterly received general praise for her qualifications from senators and media and was unanimously confirmed after being temporarily held up for outside reasons. She was sworn into office on July 13, 2021.

Awards 

 Bronze Star
 2018 James W. Foley Legacy Foundation American Hostage Freedom Award

Personal 
Easterly is the daughter of Noel Clinton Koch and June Quint Koch. She married attorney Jason Tighe Easterly in Potomac, Maryland on April 3, 2004. They have a son. Judge Catharine Easterly of the District of Columbia Court of Appeals is a sister-in-law.

References 

Year of birth missing (living people)
Living people
United States Military Academy alumni
United States Army officers
American Rhodes Scholars
Alumni of Pembroke College, Oxford
George W. Bush administration personnel
Obama administration personnel
Biden administration personnel
United States Department of Homeland Security officials
United States Military Academy faculty
United States National Security Council staffers
National Security Agency people